Marinomonas mangrovi is a Gram-negative bacterium from the genus of Marinomonas which has been isolated from rhizospheric soil from a mangrove forest on Beigang Island in Hainan province, China.

References

Oceanospirillales
Bacteria described in 2015